Galadriel Lynn Putthoff Stineman is an American actress and model. She is best known for her roles as Gwen Tennyson in  Ben 10: Alien Swarm and as Cassidy Finch in The Middle.

Early life
Stineman was born in Cincinnati and named after the character Galadriel in The Lord of the Rings, which her mother read while pregnant. She completed her high-school education at Newport Central Catholic High School, in Newport, Kentucky. She was a cheerleader, dancer and horseback rider while at school. Although she participated in the drama club, she never captured a starring role in any play at school level. 

She grew up in Northern Kentucky, where her father was a tennis player as well as a teacher and her mother, a nurse. She then attended Northern Kentucky University. As a very involved undergrad, she was president of Delta Zeta sorority, vice president of student government and named "Outstanding Senior of the Year". It was during her time at NKU that she became involved in student films and eventually signed with a couple local talent agencies to pick up extra money. She graduated magna cum laude in 2007 from the College of Informatics.

Career
Stineman moved to Los Angeles after graduation and made her debut in Fame (2009) as a dancer. Her breakthrough came when she portrayed Gwen Tennyson in  Ben 10: Alien Swarm (2009), a science fiction action film by Alex Winter based on the Cartoon Network animated series Ben 10: Alien Force. She was the second actress to play the part of Gwen.  Stineman had been involved in major projects since 2009. She played Audra in Junkyard Dog (2010) and Cassidy in The Middle (2012–14)

Personal life

Stineman is married to actor Kevin Joy and they have two sons, Atticus and Sawyer.

Filmography

Video games

References

External links

 

Living people
American television actresses
Actresses from Cincinnati
Actresses from Kentucky
American film actresses
21st-century American actresses
American voice actresses
American video game actresses
Northern Kentucky University alumni
Newport Central Catholic High School alumni
1984 births